is a former Japanese football player. He plays for ReinMeer Aomori.

Playing career
Yoshiyuki Okumura joined to J3 League club; Gainare Tottori in 2015. In 2016, he moved to ReinMeer Aomori.

References

External links

Profile at ReinMeer Aomori

1993 births
Living people
Osaka University of Economics alumni
Association football people from Hyōgo Prefecture
Japanese footballers
J3 League players
Japan Football League players
Gainare Tottori players
ReinMeer Aomori players
Association football forwards